Barrio Los Aromos is a suburb of Maldonado, Uruguay.

Geography
Barrio Los Aromo borders the suburbs Cerro Pelado to the east and Villa Delia to the south, and to the west with the Municipal Cemetery and the park Chacra Brunett.

Population
In 2011 Barrio Los Aromos had a population of 956.
 
Source: Instituto Nacional de Estadística de Uruguay

References

External links
 INE map of Maldonado, Villa Delia, La Sonrisa, Cerro Pelado, Los Aromos and Pinares-Las Delicias

Populated places in the Maldonado Department